Oliver Marach and Fabrice Martin were the defending champions, but Marach chose not to participate this year and Martin chose to compete in Doha instead.

Rohan Bopanna and Jeevan Nedunchezhiyan won the title, defeating Purav Raja and Divij Sharan in the final, 6–3, 6–4.

Seeds

Draw

References
 Main Draw

Aircel Chennai Open – Doubles
2017 Aircel Chennai Open
Maharashtra Open